is a Japanese animation studio established on 1 June 1973. It is located in Nerima, Tokyo.

History 
Asahi Production was founded in 1973, initially establishing itself as a specialized shooting studio and PR movie company. At its inception, Tokyo Movie Co., Ltd, and Tokyo Movie Shinsha (today TMS Entertainment) were its first affiliates. Production of promotional videos for large companies and industry organizations, such as the Japan Insurance Association and Asahi Chemical, was the studio's main business.

Works

Television series
Hello Kitty: Ringo no Mori no Fantasy (2006, for Sanrio)
Sugarbunnies (2007, for Sanrio)
Hello Kitty: Ringo no Mori no Mystery (2007, for Sanrio)
Blue Drop (2007, with BeSTACK)
Hello Kitty: Ringo no Mori to Parallel Town (2007–2008, for Sanrio)
Sugarbunnies: Chocolat! (2008, for Sanrio)
Sugarbunnies: Fleur (2009, for Sanrio)
Super Robot Wars Original Generation: The Inspector (2010–2011)
Picchipichi Shizuku-chan (2012–2013)
Heroes: Legend of the Battle Disks (2013)
Himegoto (2014)
Merman in My Tub (2014)
Funassyi no FunaFunaFuna Biyori (2015)
Million Doll (2015)
Onsen Yōsei Hakone-chan (with Production Reed, 2015)
Pan de Peace! (2016)
Omae wa Mada Gunma o Shiranai (2018)
Namu Amida Butsu! -Rendai Utena- (2019)
Heaven's Design Team (2021)
Wave!!: Let's Go Surfing!! (2021)
Peach Boy Riverside (2021)
Girls' Frontline (2022)
Giant Beasts of Ars (2023)
A Galaxy Next Door (2023)

Films
Haru no Ashioto The Movie: Ourin Dakkan (2006)
Alice in the Country of Hearts: Wonderful Wonder World (2011)
Santa Company: Christmas no Himitsu (2019)
Wave!!: Let's Go Surfing!! (2020)

OVAs/ONAs
Angel Blade Punish! (2004–2005)
Tokimeki Memorial 4 Original Animation: Hajimari no Finder (2009)
Prism Magical: Prism Generations! (2010)
Sorette Dakara ne! (2011)
Chōyū Sekai: Being the Reality (2017)

References

External links
Official website 

 
Japanese companies established in 1973
Mass media companies established in 1973
Japanese animation studios
Nerima
Animation studios in Tokyo